Madan Bauri was an Indian politician belonging to All India Trinamool Congress. He was elected as a member of West Bengal Legislative Assembly from Indpur in 1982, 1987 and 1991. He also served as Civil Defence State Minister of West Bengal Government from 1992 to 1995. He joined All India Trinamool Congress in 2001. He died on 16 September 2015 at the age of 78.

References

2015 deaths
Trinamool Congress politicians from West Bengal
West Bengal MLAs 1982–1987
West Bengal MLAs 1987–1991
West Bengal MLAs 1991–1996
State cabinet ministers of West Bengal
1930s births